Cryptocarpus pyriformis which is commonly known as salt bush or monte salado is native to the Galápagos Islands as well as mainland Ecuador and Peru. It is the sole representative of the genus Cryptocarpus.

References

Nyctaginaceae
Monotypic Caryophyllales genera